Különös házasság (A Peculiar Marriage) is a 1951 Hungarian drama film directed by Márton Keleti, based on the novel of the same name (first published in 1900) by Kálmán Mikszáth. It was entered into the 1951 Cannes Film Festival.

Cast
 Gyula Benkő as Count Párdányi Buttler János
 Miklós Gábor as Bernáth Zsiga
 Lajos Rajczy as Baron Dőry István
 Hédi Temessy as Mária, daughter of Baron Dőry
 Sándor Tompa as Horváth Miklós
 Éva Örkényi as Piroska, daughter of Horváth
 Artúr Somlay as Archbishop Fischer
 Sándor Pécsi as Medve Ignác, doctor
 Sándor Szabó as Vicar Szucsinka
 Tamás Major as Jesuit
 Hilda Gobbi as Mrs. Szimácsi
 Tivadar Uray as Fáy István főispán
 Gábor Rajnay as Advocate Pereviczky
 László Kemény as Professor Kövy
 József Bihari as Csősz

References

External links

1951 films
1950s Hungarian-language films
1951 drama films
Hungarian black-and-white films
Films directed by Márton Keleti
Hungarian drama films